Hate Breeds Suffering is the second album by Napalm Death grindcore side project Lock Up. It features Tomas Lindberg on vocals.

Track listing

  "Feeding on the Opiate"  (1:29)
  "Castrate the Wreckage"  (1:34)
  "Violent Reprisal"  (1:02)
  "Detestation"  (1:34)
  "Retrogression"  (1:45)
  "Slaughterous Ways"  (1:41)
  "Dead Sea Scroll Deception"  (2:28)
  "Hate Breeds Suffering"  (2:14)
  "Catharsis"  (2:32)
  "The Jesus Virus"  (1:33)
  "Broken World"  (0:46)
  "Horns of Venus"  (2:00)
  "High Tide in a Sea of Blood"  (2:02)
  "Cascade Leviathan"  (2:42)
  "Fake Somebody / Real Nobody"  (2:00)
  "The Sixth Extinction"  (2:15)

Credits
 Tomas Lindberg - Vocals
 Nicholas Barker - Drums
 Shane Embury - Bass
 Jesse Pintado - Guitars

2002 albums
Lock Up (British band) albums